"King Nothing" is a song by American heavy metal band Metallica from their 1996 album Load, released on January 7, 1997.

The song was written by James Hetfield, Lars Ulrich, and Kirk Hammett. The song starts on a bass riff which develops into the main riff of the song. A single of "King Nothing" was released in the United States. It included a live version of the song "Ain't My Bitch", which is also on the album Load. A music video also accompanied the song. The guitars and bass are both tuned to Eb.

The words "Off to never-never land", heard at the end of the song,  are a nod to one of the song "Enter Sandman", from Metallica's preceding album, which also contains these words. Both songs have a similar structure.

"King Nothing" appeared as background music in the ninth episode of the second season of The Sopranos, "From Where to Eternity", in a scene in which Tony Soprano is speaking with Paulie Gualtieri in the Bada Bing strip club.

On the US charts, the song reached number 90 on the Billboard Hot 100, while peaking at number six on the Mainstream Rock Tracks chart.

The song circles around the theme of "be careful what you wish for". The lyrics depict a man who just wants to play the king and does not care about anything else. This ultimately leads to his downfall, as shown in "And it all crashes down, and you break your crown".

Music video

In the music video, "King Nothing" is seen wandering around a snowy wasteland, throwing away his crown, and then putting another one on. He does this so much, by the end of the video, there are crowns everywhere. At the very end, hundreds of other King Nothings surround him.

The music video, directed by Matt Mahurin, was filmed in Park City, Utah, in December 1996.

Demo
The demo of "King Nothing" was called "Load" (hence the title of the album on which it is featured) and was recorded in Lars Ulrich's home studio 'Dungeon' by James Hetfield and Ulrich on November 30, 1994.

Track listing
Canada and US single 
"King Nothing" – 5:28
"Ain't My Bitch" (Live – Irvine Meadows, California, 4 August 1996) – 6:00

US promo Single
"King Nothing" (edited version) – 4:59 	
"King Nothing" (full version) – 5:28

Charts

References

1996 songs
1997 singles
Metallica songs
Songs written by James Hetfield
Songs written by Kirk Hammett
Songs written by Lars Ulrich
Song recordings produced by Bob Rock